Jean Carlos Jiménez Centeno (born November 11 in Cabimas, Zulia) is a Colombian-Venezuelan singer and composer of vallenato, bolero and salsa. Centeno gained fame as singer and composer for the vallenato group Binomio de Oro de America. On December 31, 2005 Centeno left the Binomio de Oro to pursue his own vallenato group along accordionist Juan Fernando "Morre" Romero. In 2006 Centeno and Romero released the album Ave Libre.

Early years
Centeno's parents are Ebel Jiménez and Miryan Centeno whom as a child, with only 3 months old, took him to Villanueva, La Guajira, in Colombia and left him with María Elena Jiménez due to financial hardships. Centeno's grandfather Reynaldo was a musician, played the trumpet and the drums.  At the age of 14 years financial hardships forced him to work on the streets selling snacks, worked as a farm boy and took care of kids to survive. He traveled around town in the Department of La Guajira also singing at parties. He dreamed of becoming a ballads singer or soap opera actor.

In 1992 participated along Poncho Cotes Jr in a song contest in the Colombian town of San Juan del Cesar, in La Guajira. The song "Un ángel mas en el cielo" of his authorship was a dedication to his role model singer Rafael Orozco Maestre, then recently deceased, and lead singer of the Binomio de Oro de America vallenato group.

Israel Romero the accordionist from the Binomio de Oro de America became interested on Centeno's talent and hired him as backup singer for the group. Centeno sang the group hits "No te vayas", "Celos", "Manantial de amor", among others and also got to be recorded by the Binomio de Oro; "Volvió el dolor", "Me ilusioné", "Amigo el corazón" and "Me vas a extrañar".

Discography

With Binomio de Oro de America
1993 - Todo Corazón
1994 - De la Mano con el Pueblo
1995 - Lo Nuestro
Centeno and Jorgito Celedon became lead singers
1996 - A su Gusto
1997 - Seguimos por lo Alto
1998 - 2000
1999 - Más cerca de tí
2000 - Difícil de Igualar
2001 - Haciendo Historia
2003 - Que Viva el Vallenato
2004 - En todo su Esplendor
2005 - Grafiti de Amor
On December 31, 2005 Centeno decided to leave Binomio de Oro and joined initially accordionist Robert Urbina, but later teamed up with Israel Romero's nephew, Juan Fernando "El Morre" Romero to create their own vallenato group.

With Morre Romero and Ronald Urbina
2006 - Ave Libre
2008 - Inconfundible

With Ronald Urbina
2012 - Asi Canto Yo

See also
 Binomio de Oro de America
 Jorgito Celedon

References

External links
  Jean Carlos Centeno official website

1968 births
Living people
People from Cabimas
20th-century Colombian male singers
Vallenato musicians
Venezuelan emigrants to Colombia
21st-century Colombian male singers